The National Baby Food Festival, established in 1991, is a large community festival that takes place around mid-July in Fremont, Michigan (
) , home of the Gerber Products Company, a Nestlé company.

Originally entitled Old Fashioned Days, this celebration celebrated its 20th anniversary as the Baby Food Festival on July 21, 2010. More than 100,000 people will come to Fremont, a town of about 4,600, to celebrate the festival, which takes up a section of Main Street downtown. The three-day event includes live music performances, carnival rides, children's events, games, entertainment, markets and exhibitions. Food and non-alcoholic beverages are sold at various locations. The parade including custom vehicles and antique cars is often included.

Part of the celebration includes the selection of a Festival Queen from the local area. Pageant winners receive scholarships and prizes, and are asked to represent the festival and locale at noteworthy events.

There was a virtual festival in 2020.

External links
National Baby Food Festival Page at Fremont Chamber of Commerce

References 

Tourist attractions in Newaygo County, Michigan
Food and drink festivals in the United States
Festivals in Michigan